For other uses related to Sidhhanath Temple, see: Sidhhanath Temple (disambiguation)

Bhoodsidhhnatha is another name for the Hindu deity Siddhanath, who is believed  to be incarnation of Shiva. Siddhanath is patron god of adjacent regions and one of among several regional protective (Kshetrapal) gods of Maharashtra. There is a temple dedicated to Bhoodsidhhnatha at the village of Bhood in Maharashtra., India.

Chaitra-Astami 
An annual festival celebrating Bhoodsidhhanatha is held on Chaitra Krishna Ashtami, a three-day celebration of the deity's wedding ceremony. On the first day, a bullock cart race is organised near the temple. Second day is the most important day and on this day Sasankathi(Holy long wooden or metallic bar) and Diva(Holy lamp) are the main attractions. On the third day Kusumba(Type of Bhang) is serveed as Prasadam to Bhoodsidhhnatha.

See also
Sidhhanath Temple, Kharsundi
Revansiddha Temple, Renavi

Gallery

References

Hindu temples in Maharashtra
Forms of Shiva